Karl Shiels (15 September 1971 – 15 July 2019) was an Irish actor of both stage and screen.

His stage roles included Henry IV, Part 1, Penelope, At Swim-Two-Birds, The Spanish Tragedy, The Duchess of Malfi, The Shadow of a Gunman and This Lime Tree Bower. His screen roles included Fair City, Peaky Blinders and Batman Begins.

He died suddenly at the age of 47, with a play he had directed underway in Dublin and an ongoing screen role as Robbie Quinn in Fair City.

Career
He took up performance in the early 1990s, training with the Gaiety School of Acting. In 1998, he debuted with the Abbey Theatre.

Among his stage theatre credits were Henry IV, Part 1, Beauty in a Broken Place, At Swim-Two-Birds and The Barbaric Comedies (those four for the Abbey), The Spanish Tragedy, The Duchess of Malfi, The Shadow of a Gunman, Conor McPherson's This Lime Tree Bower and Mark O'Rowe's Howie the Rookie, as well as the Druid Theatre Company production of Enda Walsh's Penelope.

Shiels was artistic director of the Theatre Upstairs (above Lanigan's Bar on Eden Quay), and, before this, he had a company, Semper Fi.

Among his screen credits were the films Batman Begins and Veronica Guerin, as well as the television series Peaky Blinders, The Tudors, Into the Badlands, Titanic: Blood and Steel, The Clinic and Doctors. He played Robbie Quinn in the soap opera Fair City between 2014 and his death in 2019. As Quinn he held many high-profile storylines alongside the actress Aisling O'Neill, who portrayed his on-screen lover Carol Foley. Quinn appeared on screen the night before his death in scenes with Carol, and also became embroiled in disputes with the characters Nora and Ray in the same episode. He had worked on set up to two days before dying, the break only coming about due to the arrival of the weekend. He had also been expected to play a leading role in the 30th anniversary episode, scheduled for September 2019.

Awards and nominations
In 1999, Shiels won Best Actor at the Dublin Theatre Festival for his performance in Comedians. In 2004, he was nominated in the Best Actor category at the Irish Film and Television Academy (IFTA) awards for his performance in Capital Letters. In 2010, he was nominated in the Best Actor category at The Stage Awards. In 2011, he was nominated in the Best Actor category at The Irish Times Theatre Awards. In 2013, The Irish Times Theatre Awards presented him with the Judge's Special Prize for his theatre work and involvement in developing fresh stage talent. In 2016, he was nominated in the Best Actor category at the IFTAs.

Personal life
Shiels was from Chapelizod in Dublin.  He was a cousin of Twin Peaks actress Amy Shiels. He worked as an electrician until he turned to acting. In addition, Shiels directed the play Bullfight on Third Avenue, which was running at the Bewley's Cafe Theatre when he died and was scheduled to run throughout the month.

Death
Karl Shiels died suddenly of natural causes on 15 July 2019, aged 47. His colleagues in Fair City were informed of his death that morning and the news was relayed to the public that lunchtime. Shiels was the second actor on the soap opera to die in less than a month, following the death of Tom Jordan a little over two weeks earlier in June.

Filmography

References

External links
Karl Shiels at the British Film Institute
 
 In Pictures: Karl Shiels' Fair City timeline
 In Pictures: Karl Shiels as Robbie on Fair City over the years
 Crawley, Peter. "Karl Shiels: remembering a singular figure on stage and screen – A passionate advocate for originality, he knew that theatre could be electrifying". The Irish Times. 16 July 2019.

1971 births
2019 deaths
Artistic directors
Irish electricians
Irish male film actors
Irish male soap opera actors
Irish male Shakespearean actors
Irish male stage actors
Irish male television actors
Irish theatre directors
Male actors from Dublin (city)
21st-century Irish male actors